Polam Hall School is a mixed all-through school located in Darlington, County Durham, England. Polam Hall was founded as a Quaker "boarding school" for girls. It is now mixed-gender and inter-denominational but still retains its Quaker traditions and ethos.

History of the house
Harrington Lee, a prominent Darlington merchant, built a house in the country in 1794 and lived there with his family for 27 years; upon his death in 1824 his remaining family sold the property in the area referred to as 'Polam Hill'.

In 1825, Jonathan Backhouse, a financial backer of the railways, bought 'Polam Hall' (on Polam Hill) and was responsible for renovations including the landscaping of the grounds; it was not until 1828 that his wife Hannah (née Chapman Gurney) and family moved in.  As members of the Darlington Society of Friends (Quakers) and ministers they undertook missionary work resulting in them having to travel extensively around England and America.  As cousins of Edward Pease, Joseph John Gurney and Elizabeth Fry, they were able to work with each other to improve their world.  In the 1841 census, the family are listed as living in 'Polam Hall', but it is understood that both Jonathan, who died in 1842, and Hannah, who died in 1850, continued to refer to their home as 'Polam Hill'.

The school history

'Polam Hall' was sold to William and Robert Thompson, who leased it to the Procter sisters for use as a Quaker ladies’ finishing school. Jane Proctor had founded her first school in Selby which had lasted for twenty years. She founded "Selby School" in 1848 as a boarding school for girls at Number 11 Townhouse, in Houndgate helped by her sisters Elizabeth and Barbara. Their school moved to Polam Hall after six years with Jane Procter as the head. 

Polam Hall's owners (the Thompsons) went into liquidation in 1878, and one of their largest creditors, Quaker M.P. Arthur Pease, became Polam's new owner.

In 2004, boys were introduced to the school for the first time when the sixth form became coeducational. Previously, some boys from the nearby boys' independent school Hurworth House School would take certain subjects there. A separate boys' senior section was later set up for boys aged 11–16. After the closure of its sister school Hurworth House.

In October 2013, the school announced intentions to convert from a private to a free school in 2015..."Independent Education without Fees". In June 2014, the school was awarded free school status by the Department of Education, and became a free (or public) school in September 2015.  In 2017 it joined the Woodard Academies Trust.  Polam Hall is funded by the state, but, according to its website, "retains an independent-school ethos".

Boarding and sixth form no more
Boarding was available to pupils aged 8 and above. They were looked after by a team of resident house staff. The school announced in 2019 that it would cease taking boarders in 2019 because the numbers involved made it noncommercial. The school's sixth form had already proved to be too small.

Polam Old Scholars
The Polam Hall Old Scholars Association (PHOSA) has existed since 1894 and is a registered charity (No. 1058652), old scholars receive an annual newsletter and have the opportunity to attend the PHOSA AGM every June.

Notable Old Scholars include:
Ruth Gemmell – actor, theatre director and playwright
Ann Jellicoe – actor, theatre director and playwright
Maria Jane Taylor (née Dyer) – 19th-century Protestant Christian missionary in China

References

External links
Official Website
, Old Polam Hall Photos on pbase
Profile on MyDaughter

Educational institutions established in 1847
1847 establishments in England
Quaker schools in England
Secondary schools in the Borough of Darlington
Primary schools in the Borough of Darlington
Free schools in England
Schools in Darlington